Barbara Masini (born 22 January 1974) is an Italian politician who served as Senator from Tuscany in the mixed group as part of the More Europe–Action sub-group from 2018 to 2022.

In February 2022, Masini switched parties from Forza Italia becoming centrist party Action's second senator.

See also 

 List of current Italian senators

References 

Living people
1974 births
Forza Italia (2013) senators
LGBT legislators in Italy
Senators of Legislature XVIII of Italy
21st-century Italian women politicians
20th-century Italian women
Women members of the Senate of the Republic (Italy)